Atheism and irreligion is uncommon in Poland with Catholic Christianity as the largest faith. However, it is on the rise, which has caused tensions in the country. According to a 2020 CBOS survey, non-believers make up 3% of Poland's population. 

In a public performance during the 2014 Procession of Atheists in Poland commemorated Kazimierz Łyszczyński, who is considered the first Polish atheist.

History

Atheism in Poland dates back to the Renaissance. In the sixteenth century, individuals considered to be atheists include the royal courtier Jan Zambocki, geographer Alexander Skultet and professor of the Academy of Krakow Stanislaw Zawacki. In 1588 Krakow released a pamphlet Simonis simoni Lucensis ... Athei summa Religio, suggesting that the doctor Simon of Lucca staying at the royal court says the idea that God is a figment of the mind. An important figure in the history of atheism on Polish territories was Kazimierz Łyszczyński, sentenced in 1688 (the judgment was made a year later) on the death penalty for his work on the work of De non existentia Dei  ("The Non-Existence of God").

In the nineteenth century, open proclamation of atheist views were rare, although a certain part of the intelligentsia openly admitted to atheism (including Wacław Nałkowski and Maria Sklodowska-Curie).

During the Second Republic, President Gabriel Narutowicz was accused of being an atheist.

In general, then Polish overt atheism was a very widespread view, even among anti-clerical and secular intelligentsia, as evidenced by the fact that in the Second Republic the traditional association of atheists – Freemasonry of the Great East - has not been established despite the existence of acting freethinking organizations: Polish Association of Freethinkers, Polish Association of Free Thought or Warsaw Circle of Intellectuals. They were also issued a letter Rationalist.

In the twentieth and twenty first centuries Poles declaring a lifelong or temporary atheistic worldview include Tadeusz Boy-Żeleński, Tadeusz Kotarbiński, Ludwik Krzywicki, Irena Krzywicka, Witold Gombrowicz, Władysław Gomułka, Jan Kott, Jeremi Przybora, Wisława Szymborska, Stanisław Lem, Tadeusz Różewicz, Marek Edelman, Jerzy Kawalerowicz, Zygmunt Bauman, Maria Janion, Tadeusz Łomnicki, Włodzimierz Ptak, Jacek Kuroń, Kazimierz Kutz, Jerzy Urban, Roman Polański, Jerzy Vetulani, Karol Modzelewski, Zbigniew Religa, Jan Woleński, Andrzej Sapkowski, Kora Jackowska, Lech Janerka, Wanda Nowicka, Magdalena Środa, Jacek Kaczmarski, Aleksander Kwaśniewski, Kazik Staszewski, Kuba Wojewódzki, Janusz Palikot, Jan Hartman, Maria Peszek, Dorota Nieznalska, Robert Biedroń.

After World War II to the turn of the 1980s and 1990s atheist worldview has been propagated by the state, which manifested itself, among others, in limiting building permits, as well as the expansion of the temples, the persecution of the clergy (e.g. illegal arrest of Cardinal Stefan Wyszynski) and harassment of members of the Communist Party taking regular participation in religious practices. In 1957, the decision of the Central Committee at the propaganda and agitation department of the Central Committee was established committee. Atheistic propaganda.

In the communist Poland Association of Atheists and Freethinkers worked well – supported by the authorities – and later also Society for the Promotion of Secular Culture, formed on its basis in 1969. On the other hand, some declared atheists were involved in the activities of the democratic opposition, like  Jacek Kuroń, and Adam Michnik.

After the fall of the Polish People's Republic, despite the lack of state support, atheism and the process of secularization have not disappeared. In 2007, the wave of popularity of the book "The God Delusion" by Richard Dawkins. and his social campaign under the name of The Out Campaign started in the Anglo-Saxon countries and reached Poland. Thus the List of Internet Atheists and Agnostics was established. led by Polish Association of Rationalists. On that list a person could openly admit their atheism or agnosticism. The initiative aims to promote ideological assertiveness among the unbelievers, checking the presence of believers in the social life and the consolidation and strengthening of cooperation between free thinkers. Many leading Polish media have written dozens of articles about this initiative, causing a discussion on the situation of unbelievers in Poland (Gazeta Wyborcza, Cross-section, Overview, Republic, Newsweek, Trybuna, Gazeta Pomorska, Kurier Lubelski, Wirtualna Polska, Życie Warszawy), and on the radio TOK FM was a debate about atheism between the academic priest Gregory Michalczyk and the founder and then-president of the Polish Rationalist Association Mariusz Agnosiewicz. After two months since the launch of Letters inscribed on it more than 7500 participants of the action. He went a step further informal group of the Association of atheistic organizing a campaign under the name of  Internet photo Atheists , which was launched 6 December 2009.

In response to the rapid progress of atheism in Poland in 2012 a Parliamentary Group for prevention of atheism in Poland was established by the Polish Sejm. It consists of 39 deputies and 2 senators. At the turn of 2012/2013, the Polish Association of Rationalists, together with the Foundation Freedom of Religion organized in several Polish cities including Rzeszow, Lublin, Czestochowa, Kraków and Swiebodzin an action under the slogan "Do not steal, do not kill, do not I believe" and "If you do not believe, you are not alone". According to the organizers they serve to consolidate the people of atheistic worldview. On March 29, 2014 an Atheists' March was organized in Warsaw in the framework of Days of Atheism, during which there was a staging of the execution of Kazimierz Lyszczynski, sentenced in 1689 to death for treaty "the non-existence of the gods," in which the role was played by Jan Hartman, a professor of philosophy, bioethics and then an activist of Your Movement, a progressivist political party.

Statistics
In 2004, 3.5% of the citizens of Poland identified as non-believers or indifferent religiously. According to the Eurobarometer survey in 2005 90% of Polish citizens said they believed in the existence of God, a further 4% not determined. In 2007, 3% identified as a non-believer.

Polish citizens – this means that this group has doubled its size within two years However, according to the survey from 2012 the number of people in Poland declare atheism, agnosticism or atheism was 3.2% and disbelief 4%. And, according to studies Eurobarometer in the same year 2% of the population of Poland were atheists, and 3% were agnostics and otherwise non-denominational.

According to the results of Census of Population and Housing 2011 individuals who claim not to belong to any religion accounted for 31 March 2011, 2.41% of the total Polish population. While taking into account that 7.1% covered by the census did not answer the question on religion, and to 1.63% not determined the matter, they accounted for 2.64% of those who responded to the question about religious affiliation.

According to data published in 2015 by GUS concerning the faith of Poles most atheists are in Warsaw and Zielona Gora.

Organizations
Currently, some atheists in Poland are grouped around:
 Polish Association of Rationalists
 Polish Association of Freethinkers whose patron is Kazimierz Lyszczynski
 Secular Culture Society whose patron is Tadeusz Kotarbiński,
 Polish Association of Free Thought and several other smaller organizations.

References

 
Religion in Poland
Poland